An agnel, aignel, agnel d'or or mouton d’or was a French gold coin, invented by Louis IX of France in the 13th century. The first known examples were struck under Philip the Fair from 26 January 1311 onwards.

The obverse of the coin showed the Paschal Lamb or Agnus Dei, which gave the coin its name. The reverse showed a Gothic cross. The last agnels were struck under Charles VII of France in the 15th century.

Sources
http://gallica.bnf.fr/ark:/12148/btv1b7700432x

Medieval currencies
Gold coins
13th-century establishments
15th-century disestablishments